Spendrups Bryggeri AB is a Swedish brewery founded in 1897 as Grängesbergs Bryggeri AB. The company includes the following subsidiaries Spring Wine & Spirits, Gotlands Bryggeri and Hellefors Bryggeri. Spendrups Group has approximately 900 employees and sales revenue of approximately 3 billion Swedish kronor.

The head office is located in Vårby (Huddinge Municipality) south of Stockholm. Three breweries are located in Grängesberg, Hällefors and Visby (the micro brewery Gotlands Bryggeri AB). The breweries are BRC certified (British Retailers Consortium).

In May 2011, the company presented its plans with regard to the closure of the brewery and logistics centre in Vårby and Loviseberg in 2012–14 and concentrate its production to Grängesberg in the province of Dalecarlia (Dalarna). Production at the brewery in Vårby was shut down in August 2013.

History

Spendrups history began in 1735 with the ancestor Mads Pedersen, who left the village Spentrup in Denmark and moved to Copenhagen and became a distiller. 1855 Jens Fredrik Oscar Spendrup, the grandson of Mads Pedersen, moved to Sweden and settled in Halland. 1923 Louis Spendrup, the son of Jens Fredrik Oscar, acquired Grängesbergs brewery located in Grängesberg, Dalecarlia for a sum of 65 000 SEK (Swedish krona).

Louis Spendrup’s son, Jens Fredrik “PO” attained command of the brewery 1950 and doubled sales each year throughout the 1950s. In 1967 Mariestads brewery was acquired and in 1972 the business was relocated to Grängesberg. Jens and Ulf Spendrup, the sons of Jens Fredrik "PO" Spendrup, became chief executives of Grängesbergs Brewery 1976.

The brewery's first beer using the brand Spendrup was launched at Operakällaren in Stockholm 1979. 1982 Grängesbergs Bryggeri AB changed its name to Spendrups Bryggeri AB and the brewery was listed in the stock market 1983 but chose to leave it in 2001.

1989 Spendrups purchased Kooperativa Förbundets brewing operations consisting of Wårby Bryggerier located on the outskirts of Stockholm and Sollefteå Bryggeri (presently Zeunerts brewery). Among others, the brand Norrlands Guld was included in the purchase. The brewery in Sollefteå, where Norrlands Guld was originally brewed was shut down and sold, whereas Vårby brewery was retained.

The abolishment of the state wine and liquor monopoly occurred in 1995, as a result of Sweden's entry into the European Union (EU), thus allowing Spendrups to import and distribute wine. 2001 the company started liquor distribution, as well as licensed production of Heineken. In 2009, Spendrups included the brand Schweppes in its product portfolio.

Since May 2011 Fredrik Spendrup is the CEO. He succeeded his father, Jens Spendrup, who hence became chairman of the board.

Sales
In 2015, Spendrups was Systembolaget's second largest supplier of beer, with 21.6% of deliveries (50,612,575 liters). During the same year Spendrups delivered 859,488 liters of cider and RTD’s ('Ready to drink') and 410,598 liters of non-alcoholic beverages to Systembolaget, making the company's total market share 12,5%. With regards to the restaurant market, there are no official figures.

Brands
Spendrups own brands include Spendrups, Norrlands Guld, Mariestads, Loka and Nygårda. Brands manufactured under license include Heineken, Schweppes, El Coto and Cono Sur.

External links

 Spendrups Bryggeri AB corporate website

Companies based in Stockholm County
Breweries in Sweden
Companies established in 1987
Purveyors to the Court of Sweden
Swedish brands
Articles containing video clips